Italian campaign can refer to:
Italian campaign of 1524–1525, a campaign during the Italian War
Italian campaigns of the French Revolutionary Wars, 1796–1800 campaigns led by Napoleon Bonaparte
Second Italian War of Independence, an 1859 campaign fought by Napoleon III of France and Kingdom of Sardinia against Austria
Italian campaign (World War I), a campaign fought primarily by Italy against Austria-Hungary
Italian campaign (World War II), a campaign begun after the Allied invasion of Sicily

See also
Italian War (disambiguation)